Maj-Len Grönholm (née Eriksson, 5 June 1952 Helsinki – 22 June 2009, Ingå) was a Finnish politician (Swedish People's Party), councilwoman and a former Miss Finland. As a beauty pageant competitor, she won Miss Finland in 1972 under her maiden name of Eriksson and placed fourth in Miss Scandinavia in 1973. After she stopped competing, she worked as the principal at Källhagens skola, a Swedish-speaking junior high school in Lohja. In March 2009, she went on sick leave and was in the process of applying for a disability pension when she died.

For sixteen years, she served as a councilwoman for the cities of Kauniainen and Espoo. She also ran for parliament twice. Since the beginning of 2009, she also served as a councilwoman for the municipality of Ingå until her death.

Grönholm had breast cancer. She had surgery to remove the tumors twice, once in 2002 and once in 2004. By 2007 the disease had spread to her liver. Grönholm died of cancer in 2009.

References 

 Ilta-Sanomat, 5 January 2008 p. 22

1952 births
2009 deaths
Deaths from cancer in Finland
Deaths from breast cancer
Miss Finland winners
Miss Universe 1972 contestants
Politicians from Helsinki
Swedish People's Party of Finland politicians
Beauty queen-politicians